The United Nations Security Council (UNSC) is the organ of the United Nations charged with maintaining peace and security among nations. While other organs of the United Nations only make recommendations to member governments, the Security Council has the power to make decisions which member governments are obliged to carry out under the United Nations Charter. The decisions of the Council are known as United Nations Security Council Resolutions.

There have been three major events in Iraq's history for which the UN has passed numerous resolutions: the Iran–Iraq War, the Persian Gulf War, and the Iraq disarmament crisis leading up to and following the 2003 invasion of Iraq.

Iraq related resolutions

 
Causes and prelude of the Iraq War
United Nations
Iraq
UN
Middle East peace efforts